The Ecuadorian thrush (Turdus maculirostris) is a resident bird found in western South America in western Ecuador and far northwestern Peru. It was formerly considered to be a subspecies of the spectacled thrush (yellow-eyed thrush), Turdus nudigenis, but has a narrower eyering, and is widely separated in range.

The habitat of this thrush is woodland, and forest edges and clearings, up to 2000 metres.

Description
The Ecuadorian thrush is 21.5 – 23 cm long. It is plain olive-brown above (paler than bare-eyed) and a paler brown below. The throat is brown-streaked off-white, and the lower belly is whitish. It has a narrow yellow eye ring. Sexes are similar, but young birds are flecked above and spotted below. There are no subspecies.

Behaviour
The nest is a lined bulky cup of twigs low in a tree. The only known clutch was of three reddish-blotched blue eggs.
 
The Ecuadorian thrush feeds in trees on fruit, berries and some insects and earthworms. It is a shy species, and may be largely crepuscular. It is normally alone or in pairs, but may congregate in fruiting trees, often with plumbeous-backed thrush.

References

 Clement and Hathaway Thrushes 

Ecuadorian thrush
Ecuadorian thrush
Birds of Ecuador
Ecuadorian thrush